Johnson's Island is a  island in Sandusky Bay, located on the coast of Lake Erie,  from the city of Sandusky, Ohio. It was the site of a prisoner-of-war camp for Confederate officers captured during the American Civil War. Initially, Johnson's Island was the only Union prison exclusively for Confederate officers but eventually held privates, political prisoners, persons sentenced to court martial and spies. Civilians who were arrested as guerrillas, or bushwhackers, were also imprisoned on the island. During its three years of operation, more than 15,000 men were incarcerated there.

The island is named after L. B. Johnson, the owner of the island beginning about 1852. It was originally named 'Bull's Island' by its first owner, Epaphras W. Bull, around 1809 (later misspelled "Epaproditus" Bull, by local-historians).

Civil War years
In late 1861, Federal officials selected Johnson's Island as the site for a prisoner of war camp to hold up to 2,500 captured Confederate officers. The island offered easy access by ship for supplies to construct and maintain a prison and its population. Sandusky Bay offered more protection from the elements than on other nearby islands, which were also closer to Canada in the event of a prison break. Woods of hickory and oak trees could provide lumber and fuel. The U.S. government leased half the island from private owner Leonard B. Johnson for $500 a year, and for the duration of the war carefully controlled access to the island.

The  prison opened in April 1862. A  wooden stockade surrounded 12 two-story prisoner housing barracks, a hospital, latrines, sutler’s stand, three wells, a pest house, and two large mess halls (added in August 1864). More than 40 buildings stood outside the prison walls, including barns, stables, a limekiln, forts, barracks for officers, and a powder magazine. They were used by the 128th Ohio Volunteer Infantry, which guarded the prison. The island housed officers, some of whom received money from home to purchase goods offered at the sutler’s store, stores run by those who followed the army and sold supplies to the soldiers. The prisoners had a lively community, with amateur theatrical performances, publishing, and crafts projects available.

After the unraveling of a Confederate espionage ring which had been plotting the seizure of the Great Lakes warship USS Michigan and a mass breakout of prisoners, Forts Johnson and Hill were constructed over the winter of 1864–65.  They were not operational until March 1865, in the war's final months, when the prisoner population peaked at 3,200.

More than 15,000 men passed through Johnson's Island until it was closed in September 1865. About 200 prisoners died as a result of the harsh Ohio winters, food and fuel shortages, and disease. 206 of them are buried in the Confederate Cemetery located on the island.  The cemetery was purchased in 1908 by the United Daughters of the Confederacy of Cincinnati. Johnson's Island had one of the lowest mortality rates of any Civil War prison. Confederates made many escape attempts, including efforts by some to walk across the frozen Lake Erie to freedom in Canada, but only a handful of escapes were successful.

Among the prominent Confederate generals imprisoned on Johnson's Island were Isaac R. Trimble and James J. Archer (both captured at the Battle of Gettysburg), William Beall, Thomas Benton Smith, Edward "Allegheny" Johnson and Missouri cavalrymen M. Jeff Thompson and John S. Marmaduke, William Lewis Cabell later Mayor of Dallas and Lieutenant Christopher Columbus Nash, later the sheriff of Grant Parish, Louisiana, who directed the Colfax riot in 1873, was also imprisoned at Johnson's Island.

Postbellum
After the war, the prison camp was abandoned. Most of the buildings were auctioned off by the Army, and some were razed after falling into disrepair. The last antebellum house burned down by accident in 1901. About 1894, a summer resort was established at the eastern end of the island, but its pavilion burned in 1897 and, although the pavilion was later rebuilt, the resort failed. The land was used for farming and rock quarrying. Many lakeside homes have since been built, and the island is now quite developed with two subdivisions. As a result of this development, most of the Civil War-related sites have been razed.

On June 8, 1910 Moses Ezekiel's statue Southern (or the Lookout), a monument to the Confederate prisoners held on the island, was unveiled.

In 1990 Johnson's Island was designated a National Historic Landmark. A causeway was built to connect it with the mainland. The Confederate cemetery, as well as Fort Hill in the interior of the island, are accessible to the public. Ground-penetrating radar studies have proved that several graves lie outside its fence. Heidelberg University conducts yearly archeology digs at the prison site.

The Friends and Descendants of Johnson's Island Civil War Prison was formed in 2001 to help in the preservation, interpretation, and education of the Johnson's Island Prison site. In conjunction with Heidelberg University, the Friends have sponsored educational and research programming at this National Historic Landmark.

Notable inmates
 Isaac R. Trimble (1802–1888), United States Army officer, a civil engineer, a prominent railroad construction superintendent and executive, and Confederate general.
 James J. Archer (1817–1864), lawyer, United States Army officer during the Mexican–American War, and Confederate brigadier general.
 William Beall (1825–1883), Confederate brigadier general.
 Thomas Benton Smith (1838–1923), Confederate brigadier general.
 Edward "Allegheny" Johnson (1816–1873), United States Army officer and Confederate general.
 M. Jeff Thompson (1826–1876), Confederate brigadier general in the Missouri State Guard in the American Civil War and Confederate cavalry officer.
 John S. Marmaduke (1833–1887), 25th Governor of Missouri and Confederate general.
 William Lewis Cabell (1827–1911), Confederate brigadier general and a Mayor of Dallas, Texas.
 Christopher Columbus Nash (1838–1922), Confederate soldier, merchant, sheriff in Grant Parish, Louisiana.
 John Marshall Stone (1830–1900), Governor of Mississippi, 1876–1882 and 1890–1896 and Confederate soldier.
 James Steptoe Johnston (1843–1924), Confederate soldier, preacher, Bishop of West Texas (Episcopal Church), and educator.
 William Tennent Stockton (1812-1869), Confederate Colonel, and mayor of Quincy, Florida. Founded a company in and was appointed captain of the 1st Florida Cavalry Regiment.

See also
 American Civil War prison camps
 Prisoner of war mail
 Davids Island (New York)
 Camp Chase, Columbus Ohio

References

External links

 Friends and Descendants of Johnson's Island

 Johnson's Island Memorial Project Broken Link.
 Johnson's Island Preservation Society – includes Johnson's Island Museum
 Roy Swartz's Johnson's Island Page
 
    
 
 Johnson's Island Prison Collector Community

American Civil War prison camps
Defunct prisons in Ohio
Historic American Landscapes Survey in Ohio
National Historic Landmarks in Ohio
Islands of Ottawa County, Ohio
National Register of Historic Places in Ottawa County, Ohio
Islands of Lake Erie in Ohio
1862 establishments in Ohio
Temporary populated places on the National Register of Historic Places
Confederate States of America cemeteries